Mohammad Reza Mahdavi (born 27 January 1981 in Rasht) is an Iranian football player, who currently plays for Sepidrood. He played most his career for his hometown team Damash.

Club career
He has played most his career for his hometown teams Pegah Gilan and Damash Gilan. After Damash relegation to Azadegan League in 2009, he moved to Pro League team Steel Azin along with other Damash players Afshin Chavoshi and Ali Nazarmohammadi where he stayed for one season and return to Damash in 2010. He helped Damash to go back to IPL in 2011 as club's captain.

After the relegation of Damash, Mahdavi joined Esteghlal Khuzestan. He was also named as the club's captain after the departure of Sohrab Bakhtiarizadeh.

Club career statistics

 Assist Goals

References

External links
 Iran Pro League Stats

Iranian footballers
Persian Gulf Pro League players
Azadegan League players
Pegah Gilan players
Damash Gilan players
Steel Azin F.C. players
Esteghlal Khuzestan players
Sepidrood Rasht players
People from Rasht
1981 births
Living people
Association football midfielders
Sportspeople from Gilan province